"Who's in Your Head" is a song by American group Jonas Brothers. It was released through Republic Records as a single on September 17, 2021. The song was produced by Max Martin and Ilya.

Background and promotion
"Who's in Your Head" has been described as "another breezy tune" that is "an upbeat pop number bolted onto a funky guitar refrain and featuring some chandelier-busting falsetto", as well as "bring[ing] the funk". Brothers Joe and Nick share vocals on the chorus, singing: "I wanna know, who's in your head? / Stealing your heart while I'm still breathing / Who's in your bed? / Wrapped in your arms while I ain't sleeping / Got lost in your halo, halo / I just wanna know / Now who's in your head, in your head?". The song is lyrically about an existing relationship that ended due to their partner cheating, which also involves the person who they cheated with, and wondering of why they got together with the partner in the first place. A lyric video was released along with the song.

On September 5, 2021, the Jonas Brothers performed the song on their Remember This Tour at the Red Rocks Park and Amphitheatre in Colorado. They posted a video of it to the band's TikTok account, writing "Right now you're listening to our new song...we just performed it for the first time at Red Rocks on the Remember This tour. This song is called 'Who's in Your Head' and it drops on September 17th!". The band then announced the release of the single and cover art two days later. Shortly after the release of the song, the Jonas Brothers announced that a music video would be released, also announcing it at the end of the lyric video.

Critical reception
Jason Lipshutz of Billboard praised co-writers Max Martin and Rami Yacoub, proclaiming them as "a 15-year reunion of pop powerhouses responsible for penning songs like Britney Spears' "Oops! I Did It Again" and NSYNC's It's Gonna Be Me" and went on to state that "even those unaware of the behind-the-scenes players, however, will lap up the latest JoBros offering, an ode to envy straight out of the Nick Jonas "Jealous" playbook with a delectable guitar riff that would have fit on their Happiness Begins album". Mikael Melo of ET Canada simply deemed the song as "a BOP".

Music video
A music video for the song premiered on September 30, 2021. It was directed by Christian Breslauer ("Industry Baby", "The Box") who also previously directed the Brothers' video for "Leave Before You Love Me" with Marshmello. Features RiRia, an actor and former international award-winning flute player from Japan.

Credits and personnel
Credits adapted from Tidal.

Jonas Brothers
 Joe Jonas – vocals, songwriting
 Nick Jonas – vocals, bass, songwriting
 Kevin Jonas – guitar, songwriting

Side musicians
 Max Martin – production, songwriting, programming, background vocals, bass, drums, synthesizing
 Ilya – production, songwriting, programming, background vocals, bass, synthesizing
 Rami Yacoub – songwriting, background vocals, guitar
 David Stewart – songwriting, guitar
 Shellback – bass, drums
 John Hanes – engineering, studio personnel
 Sam Holland – engineering, studio personnel
 Serban Ghenea – mixing, studio personnel
 Randy Merrill – mastering, studio personnel

Charts

Weekly charts

Year-end charts

Release history

References

2021 singles
2021 songs
Jonas Brothers songs
Songs written by Joe Jonas
Songs written by Nick Jonas
Songs written by Kevin Jonas
Songs written by Max Martin
Songs written by Ilya Salmanzadeh
Songs written by Rami Yacoub
Song recordings produced by Max Martin
Song recordings produced by Ilya Salmanzadeh